Epermenia pimpinella is a moth in the family Epermeniidae. It was described by Mary Murtfeldt in 1900. It is found in North America, where it has been recorded from South Carolina, Ohio, Illinois, Arkansas and Oklahoma.

The wingspan is 12–14 mm. The forewings range from dark slate grey to brownish, with an intermingling of dingy-white scales and with a generally smudged appearance with purplish reflections. There are three rounded dorsal tufts overlying a fine paler fringe. The hindwings are narrowly lanceolate, with long fine silky fringes.

The larvae feed on Cryptotaenia, Taenidia and Zizia species. They mine the leaves of their host plant. The mine has the form of a full-depth blotch. The black granular frass is deposited within the mine. Larvae have a deep brownish yellow body and a brownish-orange head.

References

Epermeniidae
Moths described in 1900
Moths of North America